Krisztián Lisztes may refer to:

Krisztián Lisztes (footballer, born 1976), Hungarian football midfielder
Krisztián Lisztes (footballer, born 2005), Hungarian football midfielder and son of the above